The 2010-11 FK Baku season was the club's thirteenth season in the Azerbaijan Premier League.
They started the season under German manager Winfried Schäfer, however he was sacked and replaced by Latvian Aleksandrs Starkovs in January 2011. FK Baku finished the season in sixth place. They also took part in the 2010–11 Azerbaijan Cup, getting knocked out by Khazar Lankaran in the semi-final stage. Baku entered the 2010–11 UEFA Europa League at the first qualifying round stage, and got knocked out in this round by Budućnost Podgorica, from Montenegro, after fielding a suspended player in the first leg in which Budućnost Podgorica were awarded a 3–0 win after the original match had ended in a 2–1 win for Baku.

Squad

Transfers

Summer

In:

Out:

Winter

In:

Out:

Competitions

Azerbaijan Premier League

First round

Results

Table

Championship group

Results

Table

Azerbaijan Cup

UEFA Europa League

First qualifying round

Notes
Note 1: UEFA awarded Budućnost Podgorica a 3–0 win due to Baku fielding a suspended player in the first leg. The original match had ended in a 2–1 win for Baku.

Squad statistics

Appearances and goals

|-
|colspan="14"|Players who appeared for Baku who left on loan during the season:

|-
|colspan="14"|Players who appeared for Baku who left during the season:

|}

Goal scorers

Disciplinary record

References
Qarabağ have played their home games at the Tofiq Bahramov Stadium since 1993 due to the ongoing situation in Quzanlı.

Baku
FC Baku seasons